The Nicaraguan harvest mouse (Reithrodontomys paradoxus) is a species of rodent in the family Cricetidae.
It is found in Costa Rica and Nicaragua.

References

Musser, G. G. and M. D. Carleton. 2005. Superfamily Muroidea. pp. 894–1531 in Mammal Species of the World a Taxonomic and Geographic Reference. D. E. Wilson and D. M. Reeder eds. Johns Hopkins University Press, Baltimore.

Reithrodontomys
Rodents of Central America
Mammals described in 1970
Taxonomy articles created by Polbot